Petr Svoboda (born February 14, 1966) is a Czech former professional ice hockey defenceman who played 17 seasons in the National Hockey League (NHL) for the Montreal Canadiens, Buffalo Sabres, Philadelphia Flyers and Tampa Bay Lightning. He was the first Czech to play over 1,000 games in the NHL.

He is currently the director of hockey operations for Lausanne HC.

Playing career
In 1984, Svoboda had participated in the world Under-18 ice hockey championships in then-West Germany as a part of the Czechoslovak team, and after playing one game, he defected to the West in order to play hockey at a higher professional level. That spring, he was selected fifth overall in the 1984 NHL Entry Draft by the Montreal Canadiens. His career highlights include winning the Stanley Cup with the Canadiens in 1986, and participating with the Czech team in the 1998 Winter Olympics in Nagano, Japan, where he scored the only goal in the gold medal game against Russia. He retired from professional hockey in 2001 and then worked as a player agent. In May 2020, he became co-owner and director of hockey operations for Lausanne HC in Switzerland.

Career statistics

Regular season and playoffs

International

See also
 List of NHL players with 1000 games played

References

External links
 

1966 births
Living people
Buffalo Sabres players
Czech ice hockey defencemen
Czechoslovak defectors
HC Litvínov players
Ice hockey players at the 1998 Winter Olympics
Medalists at the 1998 Winter Olympics
Montreal Canadiens draft picks
Montreal Canadiens players
National Hockey League All-Stars
National Hockey League first-round draft picks
Olympic gold medalists for the Czech Republic
Olympic ice hockey players of the Czech Republic
Olympic medalists in ice hockey
Sportspeople from Most (city)
Philadelphia Flyers players
Sports agents
Stanley Cup champions
Tampa Bay Lightning players
Czechoslovak ice hockey defencemen
Czechoslovak expatriate sportspeople in Canada
Czechoslovak expatriate sportspeople in the United States
Czechoslovak expatriate ice hockey people
Expatriate ice hockey players in Canada
Czech expatriate ice hockey players in the United States
Czech expatriate ice hockey players in Switzerland